Marcio Feitosa (May 16, 1976) is a Brazilian 6th degree black belt in Brazilian jiu-jitsu. He has learned directly from Carlos Gracie Jr., founder of the Gracie Barra Academy in Rio de Janeiro. He has risen to the podium eight times from 1997 to 2006 at several world championships.

In 2013, Feitosa was ranked one of the Top 10 fighters of all time by the BJJ Heroes website. Throughout his career he has collected many titles such as the IBJJF World Championship, the ADCC Submission Wrestling World Championship, the Brazilian Nationals and the Pan-Americans. He is one of the strongest competitors of his generation having won against fighters such as Urijah Faber, Léo Vieira, Vítor Ribeiro, Royler Gracie and Leonardo Santos.

Since the age of 15 he has been acting as a teacher, starting as an assistant instructor. He is the co-founder of the Gracie Barra Headquarters in Irvine, California and the executive director of Gracie Barra Brasil.

Early life 

Marcio Feitosa was born on May 16, 1976 and raised in the Barra da Tijuca neighborhood, home for several fighters and instructors of the Gracie Family, such as Carlos Gracie Jr., Roger Gracie, Kyra Gracie and Ryan Gracie.

His father abandoned the household when he and his brother were very young.

When he was 12 years old he began studying Brazilian jiu-jitsu with Carlos Gracie Jr. at the Gracie Barra Academy, founded two years before. At the age of 15 he was invited by his master Carlos Gracie Jr. to be an assistant instructor at the academy.

Feitosa received the black belt at the age of 19. In 1996 he wrote his name in the BJJ history when he won the Pan-American Brazilian Jiu-Jitsu Championship, held in the United States, and the Brazilian National Jiu-Jitsu Championship.

In the year 1997, he became a teacher in Japan, where he met Nao Takigawa. At Feitosa invitation, Takigawa moved to Brazil in 1998 to train at the Gracie Barra academy and became a black belt in 2004. The following year, Feitosa and Takigawa founded the Gracie Barra Japan, in Kobe.

From 2007 to 2009, he was a columnist for Tapout, a martial arts magazine published by SMP, Inc.

In 2015 he taught the first class ever at the brand new Gracie Barra Itaipava academy founded by actor Thiago Lacerda and Rodrigo Scott.

Instructor lineage 

Mitsuyo "Count Koma" Maeda → Carlos Gracie, Sr. → Carlos Gracie Jr. → Marcio Feitosa

Tournament titles 

Marcio Feitosa is a black belt since 1996. He has been eight times at the World Championship finals, winning on three occasions.

Mixed martial arts record

|-
| Loss
| align=center| 0-1-1
|  Bart Palaszewski
| Decision (Split)
| IFL - Gracie vs. Miletich
| 
| align=center| 3
| align=center| 4:00
| Yokohama, Kanagawa, Japan
| 
|-
| Draw
| align=center| 0-0-1
|  Dokonjonosuke Mishima
| Draw
| Shooto - R.E.A.D. 9
| 
| align=center| 3
| align=center| 5:00
| Moline, Illinois, United States
|

Personal life 
From 2001 to 2004 Marcio Feitosa dated and was engaged to Brazilian actress Taís Araújo.

Filmography

DVD releases 
Marcio Feitosa has produced and appeared on various instructional DVDs releases.

References

External links 
 
 Marcio Feitosa on BJJ Heroes
 Marcio Feitosa on Instagram
 Marcio Feitosa on Twitter
 Marcio Feitosa on Facebook

Brazilian practitioners of Brazilian jiu-jitsu
Living people
1976 births
World Brazilian Jiu-Jitsu Championship medalists
Brazilian male mixed martial artists
Mixed martial artists utilizing Brazilian jiu-jitsu
Sportspeople from Rio de Janeiro (city)